Marfrance is an unincorporated community and coal town in Greenbrier County, West Virginia, United States.

The community's name is an amalgamation of Margaret and Frances, these being the names of local coal mines.

References

Unincorporated communities in Greenbrier County, West Virginia
Unincorporated communities in West Virginia
Coal towns in West Virginia